Anjan Dutta (Bengali: অঞ্জন দত্ত) is an Indian film director, actor, and singer-songwriter known for his work in the Bengali alternative music genre anyodharar gaan. As an actor, Dutt began his career in Bengali cinema in the Mrinal Sen film Chalachitro, for which he won the best newcomer actor award at the Venice Film Festival. He acted in Aparna Sen's hit film, Mr. and Mrs. Iyer. In 2018 he featured in Swapnasandhani's new play Taraye Taraye, as Vincent van Gogh, under the direction of Kaushik Sen.

He is also a national award-winning filmmaker and is one of the most prominent directors of Bengali cinema, directing Dutta Vs Dutta, Madly Bangalee, The Bong Connection, Chalo Let's Go, and Ranjana Ami Ar Ashbona. In recent years, he has directed a Byomkesh film series.

Early years 
Anjan Dutt  was raised in the mountains of North Bengal. He had his schooling from St. Paul's School in Darjeeling.

In the late seventies, he joined a group called Open Theatre and in the early eighties performed plays translated from works of renowned foreign playwrights like Sartre, Peter Weiss, Jean Genet and Bertold Brecht. The group clearly drew inspiration from Nandikar, a highly active and already famous theatre group at that time. Due to politically sensitive content, they faced many obstructions in producing and performing their work, and eventually, the group discontinued its repertoire.

Dutt was first selected in the feature film Chalachitro, directed by renowned filmmaker Mrinal Sen. The film and his performance were critically acclaimed at the Venice Film Festival, but for unknown reasons, it was never released commercially. Dutt said that he was more interested in doing art cinema rather than commercial mainstream cinema. After doing a few art films that were not so commercially successful, including the critically well-received Juganto, scarcity of job opportunities forced him to take up jobs in advertising and later as a journalist for the Kolkata-based daily, The Statesman.

Singing career 
At that time, Dutt was greatly influenced by the music of Bob Dylan, Kabir Suman who had heralded a new era in Bengali music through his songs. These songs and lyrics, commonly referred to as Jeebonmukhi (literally meaning "towards life"), were concerned with the tough reality of Bengali middle-class social life, in and around Kolkata.

Personal life 
Anjan Dutt is married to Chanda Dutt. They have a son together- Neel Dutt, who is a music director of the Indian industry.

Discography

Albums 

 Shunte Ki Chao (1994)
 Purono Guitar (1995)
 Bhalobashi Tomay (1996)
 Keu Gaan Gaye (1997)
 Ma (1998)
 Chalo Bodlai (1998)
 Priyo Bandhu (1998)
 Hello Bangladesh (1999)
 Kolkata–16 (1999)
 Bandra Blues (2000)
 Asamoy (2000)
 Rawng Pencil (2001)
 Onek Din Por (2004)
 Ichchhe Korei Eksathe (2005)
 Abar Pothe Dekha (2007)
 Ami ar Godot (2007)
 Unoshaat (2014)

Singles (1996–2011) 
 "Khawar Gaan" (3:02) (with Nachiketa Chakraborty & Suman Chattopadhyay)
 "Hotuk Shob Oshundor" (1:58) (with Shalini Chatterjee, Shayari Das, Tanushree Haldar & Sreetoma Ghosh)
 "Feludar Gaan" (3:04) (with Nachiketa Chakraborty & Suman Chattopadhyay)
 "Freedom" (5:37) (with Indrani Sen, Indranil Sen & others)
 "Sadhinota" (4:50) (with Indrani Sen, Indranil Sen & others)
 "Ekushe Pa" (3:57)
 "Bow Barracks Forever!" (4:38)
 "Tumi Na thakle" (4:25) (with Usha Uthhup)
 "Chalo Let's Go.." (4:43)
 "Ei Poth Jodi Na Sesh Hoy" (4:30) (with Srikanto Acharya & others)
 "Jedike Rasta" (3:45)
 "Tumi Nei Tai" (4:07)
 "Kato ki Korar Chhilo" (4:32)
 "Jagorone Jay Bibhabori" (2:54) (with Somlata Acharyya Chowdhury & Kabir Suman)
  "Ami Chini Go Chini Tomare"

Filmography

Awards 
 1981 – Best Actor award for film Chaalchitra at Venice Film Festival
1981 - Venice Film Festival
Alitalia Award [Winner] (1981)
Best Actor
Tied with Rodolfo Bigotti for Bosco d'amore (1981).

As A Filmmaker-
 2012 – National Film Award – Special Jury Award for Ranjana Ami Ar Ashbona
 2019- Best lyrics for Finally Bhalobasha at WBFJA for Nominated.

See also 
Neel Dutt

References

External links 

 

1953 births
Living people
Singers from Kolkata
Bengali musicians
Bengali film directors
Indian television directors
St. Paul's School, Darjeeling alumni
University of Calcutta alumni
Indian male songwriters
Film directors from Kolkata
21st-century Indian film directors
20th-century Indian male actors
21st-century Indian male actors
20th-century Indian singers
21st-century Indian singers
Male actors in Bengali cinema
Indian male film actors
Special Jury Award (feature film) National Film Award winners
21st-century Indian male singers
20th-century Indian male singers